This is a list of bridges in Poland.

Bolesławiec
Bolesławiec rail viaduct

Bydgoszcz
Fordoński Bridge
Esperanto Bridge

Gdańsk
Third Millennium John Paul II Bridge

Grudziądz
Bridge near Grudziądz

Kraków
Bridge across the Nowohucka Route
Dębnicki Bridge
Grunwaldzki Bridge in Kraków
Kotlarski Bridge
Powstańców Śląskich Bridge
Zwierzyniecki Bridge in Kraków

Konin
Bridge of the European Union (Most Unii Europejskiej), the first extradosed bridge in Poland

Ozimek
Ozimek Suspension Bridge

Płock
 Legions of Marshal Józef Piłsudski Bridge
 Solidarity Bridge

Poznań
Bolesława Chrobrego Bridge
Gabriela Narutowicza Bridge
Górczyński Bridge
Królowej Jadwigi Bridge
Lecha Bridge
Mieszka I Bridge
Przemysła I Bridge
Św. Rocha Bridge

Puławy
John Paul II Bridge in Puławy

Świnoujście

Piastowski Bridge

Toruń
East Bridge

Warsaw
Anna Jagiellon Bridge
Citadel Rail Bridge
Gdański Bridge
Grota-Roweckiego Bridge
Kierbedzia Bridge
Krasiński Bridge
Łazienkowski Bridge
Maria Skłodowska-Curie Bridge
Poniatowski Bridge
Siekierkowski Bridge
Sigismund Augustus Bridge
Śląsko-Dąbrowski Bridge
Średnicowy Bridge
Świętokrzyski Bridge

Wolin

 Bridge in Wolin
 Swing bridge in Wolin

Wrocław
Grunwaldzki Bridge
Millennium Bridge
Oławski Bridge
Peace Bridge
Rędziński Bridge
Trzebnickie Bridges
Tumski Bridge
Warszawskie Bridges
Zwierzyniecki Bridge

List of largest bridges in Poland

This is a list of notable bridges in Poland. This list sorted by length of the main span.

(*) – Planned bridge ^^ – Under construction bridge

See also

List of bridges

References

Poland
Bridges
Bridges